Seacoast United may refer to:

 Seacoast United Mariners, US soccer team based in Brunswick & Topsham, Maine
 Seacoast United Phantoms, US soccer team based in Portsmouth, New Hampshire
 Seacoast United Phantoms (NPSL), US soccer team based in Hampton, New Hampshire